Sinai 48 is an American band formed in 2006 consisting of Alex Helene (vocals), Ananiah McCarrell (guitars and synthesizers), Gary "Hoppy" Hodges (drums and percussion), and Tom Moncrieff (bass and digital editing).  The latter two were formerly members of the band Buckingham Nicks with Lindsey Buckingham and Stevie Nicks.  Sinai 48 is the first reunion of the other band members since Buckingham and Nicks joined Fleetwood Mac.
The band is named after Costco's brand of Kosher Polish Hotdogs, as three of the four band members are Jewish.

Production
Sinai 48, like US electronic indie pop outfit The Postal Service, did not traditionally record live performances together in the studio while creating their upcoming album; instead, they produced and arranged the album via the internet and the United States Postal Service by transferring pieces composed by McCarrell back and forth for each other to build upon, with written arrangement directions. Grammy Hall of Fame and Album of the Century award recipient Charles Chalmers was the overseeing producer of the album during its initial phases.  In July 2007, Bassist Tom Moncrieff and his partner Annie McLoone took over some production duties.  Other notable musicians contributing to the album include Charles Chalmers' fellow backup singers, Donna and Sandra Rhodes, who joined him as the group "Rhodes, Chalmers, and Rhodes." The bassist of Percy Sledge, Gerry Riddle, also appears on two of the tracks.  The album was released on Amazon in May 2008 and peaked at #3,550 on best-sellers in music.  It is also available from Napster and iTunes.

Biographies and history
Upon the disbanding of Buckingham Nicks, Hodges and Moncrieff continued to work in music. Hodges played live shows and recorded albums with various artists, including Stevie Ray Vaughan, B.B. King, Jose Feliciano, Little Richard, Bill Medley, and Paul Revere and the Raiders. Two of his drumming contributions hit the top 40: a remake of Buddy Holly's classic "Oh Boy" with Judy Pulver and Dancing on the Moon with Glenda Griffith.

Moncrieff recorded demos with Fleetwood Mac on the multi-platinum Tusk LP, providing songwriting assistance to Stevie Nicks, including on the top-10 hits "Gypsy" and "Sara". He also played bass on Nicks' solo LP Bella Donna.  He went on to play with Walter Egan on various LPs, including Egan's breakthrough hit Magnet and Steel, which earned them a gold record and another top-ten spot on Billboard.  While touring with Egan, he played in stadiums with bands such as Tom Petty and the Heartbreakers, Foreigner and Heart.  One of his current projects is with punk-star Kat Bjelland.

Guitarist Ananiah McCarrell released a solo classical CD in 1998 called Compassionate Witness that failed to chart, but did gain notoriety on the internet. He is classically trained in piano and received classical-guitar mentoring from Grammy award winner Mason Williams.

Alex Helene is a trained classical and Broadway-style singer, who was the youngest soloist in Tahoma Girls choir at age 6.  She won a vocal scholarship to Notre Dame de Namur University upon graduating high school.  Alex Helene's audition for the band was conducted over the phone during a trip to Israel, while she was staying in Tel Aviv.

The unusual dynamic of the band, with Moncrieff and Hodges are in their fifties and McCarrell and Helene in their 20s, contributes to the diverse musical styles of their first album.

Album
Their album is called After the Aftermath and went live July 26, 2008.
 Kiss the Rain (McCarrell)
 I Never Learned How to Dance (McCarrell)
 Life Will Be (McCarrell)
 Only One (McCarrell)
 You Don't Know (McCarrell)
 Classical Gas (Williams)
 Everyone Has Secrets (McCarrell)
 Leave Me Alone (McCarrell)
 Bright Green Eyes (McCarrell)
 Never Stop (McCarrell)

Parts of the album were mixed and mastered by Tom Moncrieff, Ananiah McCarrell and Charles Chalmers.

References
Article detailing the disbanding of Buckingham Nicks
Official Sinai 48 Site
Reference to Sinai 48 on Lindsey Buckingham's Official Site
 Mason Williams' official website (referencing McCarrell's recording activity of "Classical Gas")
[ Gary Hodges Allmusic Entry]
[ Tom Moncrieff Allmusic Entry]
[ Charles Chalmers Allmusic Entry]
 2013 Gary "Hoppy" Hodges interview on the Artist Connection Podcast

American rock music groups
Musical groups established in 2006